The 2020–21 KHL season was the 13th season of the Kontinental Hockey League. There were 23 teams that competed in 60 regular season games, beginning on 2 September 2020 and finishing on 27 February 2021. The playoffs were held from 2 March, culminating in Game 6 of the Gagarin Cup Finals on 28 April. Avangard Omsk won their first Gagarin Cup title, avenging their sweep in the finals of the 2019 Gagarin Cup playoffs, defeating CSKA Moscow by 4 games to 2.

Season changes
For the 2020–21 season, the competition was reduced to 23 teams after Admiral Vladivostok took a hiatus for the season due to the COVID-19 pandemic in Russia affecting their financial status.

With pre-season events returning to the schedule in August as a part of preparations to start the season, Jokerit, whose ability to stage games was governed by Finland's restrictions in response to the coronavirus pandemic, announced that it expected to play before a reduced audience at the Hartwall Arena during the first month of the campaign.

Due to the on-going travel restrictions against the COVID-19 pandemic, Kunlun Red Star determined that they would be unable to play in Wukesong Arena situated in Beijing, China for this season. In August, the club signed a contract to play out of Mytishchi Arena, the second venue for the 2007 Men's Ice Hockey World Championships located on the outskirts of Moscow.

Teams
The 23 teams were split into four divisions: the Bobrov Division and the Tarasov Division as part of the Western Conference, with the Kharlamov Division and the Chernyshev Division as part of the Eastern Conference.

Following Admiral Vladivostok's hiatus from the league, and to alleviate any potential issues with teams transiting during the COVID-19 pandemic, several conference and divisional changes were announced.

League standings
Each team played 60 games: playing every other team home-and-away (44 games), 8–10 games against division rivals and 6–8 games against teams in the other division in their respective conference.

Points were awarded for each game, where two points were awarded for all victories, regardless of whether it is in regulation time, in overtime or after game-winning shots. One point was awarded for losing in overtime or game-winning shots, and zero points for losing in regulation time. At the end of the regular season, the team that finished with the most points was crowned the Continental Cup winner.

Western Conference

Eastern Conference

Gagarin Cup playoffs

Ak Bars Kazan were the Eastern Conference regular season winners with 90 points. It was determined despite a 2–3 overtime loss at home to Spartak Moscow. CSKA Moscow were the Western Conference regular season winners with 91 points. It was determined following a 1–3 defeat suffered by closest challengers SKA Saint Petersburg, at home to Dynamo Moscow, leaving CSKA Moscow with an unassailable points lead. CSKA Moscow won the Continental Cup for the third season in succession and sixth time overall, defeating Ak Bars Kazan 1–0 on the final day of the regular season.

Statistics

Scoring leaders

The following players led the league in points, at the conclusion of the regular season. If two or more skaters are tied (i.e. same number of points, goals and played games), all of the tied skaters are shown.

Leading goaltenders
The following goaltenders led the league in goals against average, at the conclusion of the regular season.

Awards

Players of the Month
The following players were recognised as the best KHL players of each month.

References

External links
 

 
Kontinental Hockey League seasons
KHL